Rattan Bai (July 15, 1890January 1, 1986) was an Indian actress and singer. She was the mother of actress Shobhna Samarth, grandmother of actresses Nutan and Tanuja, great-grandmother of actresses Kajol, Tanishaa Mukerji and actor Mohnish Bahl.

Biography
Rattan Bai was a singer who wrote bhajans, composed and sang them as well. She published the lyrics of her bhajans to distribute among friends who would sing with her during Maha Shivaratri celebrations at her home in Chembur. Rattanbai acted in only one Marathi film called Swarajyachya seemewar, as Shivaji's mother.

Filmography

References

External links
 

20th-century Indian actresses
1890 births
Date of death missing
Actresses in Hindi cinema